Dergahspor Nuremberg is a German football club based in Nuremberg.

History 
The club was officially founded on 26 August 1981 in the Bavarian city of Nuremberg by Turkish immigrants, and is nowadays one of the main football clubs in the city, open to all nationalities.

At the time of being founded, nobody could foresee the enormous success that this club would have. However, as all clubs in Amateur leagues, Dergahspor suffered ups and downs. Due to the great solidarity of its members the club and its first football team could celebrate some successful years.

The first achievement was in 1987, as the team won the 'Atatürk-Cup'. A competition between all Turkish clubs in Nuremberg, hosted by the Turkish consulate. At that time nobody would have imagined, that the club would win this competition on the national level between against other Turkish clubs in Germany.

Since 2000 the main team of the club celebrated various ascends up to the second highest league in Bavaria, the Landesliga. In 2012 the ascend to the highest class, the Bayernliga was only failed in relegation games against FC Amberg.

Although Dergahspor was founded by Turkish immigrants, the club considers itself as a German club with its roots in Nuremberg. Politically neutral and undenominational. Young players, no matter their nationality or religion are welcome.

In the Landesliga-Season 2106/2017 Dergahspor is competing in Landesliga Nordost in Bavaria.

Current squad

League positions since 2010

Honours 
 Atatürk Cup: 
 Champions 1987
 Atatürk Cup: 
 Champions 2007
 Bayernliga: 
 Participant ascention round 2012

External links 
 Official website

Football clubs in Germany
Dergahspor
Association football clubs established in 1981
1981 establishments in Germany